This article lists political parties in Montserrat.

Extant parties

Defunct parties
Montserrat Labour Party (MLP)
Montserrat Democratic Party (MDP)
Movement for National Reconstruction (MNR)
National Development Party (NDP)
National Progressive Party (NPP)
New People's Liberation Movement (NPLM)
People's Progressive Alliance (PPA)
People's Liberation Movement (PLM)
Progressive Democratic Party (PDP)

See also
Politics of Montserrat
List of political parties by country

 
Political parties
Montserrat
Montserrat
Political parties